The Vickers Hydravion (No.14) was a British seaplane built by Vickers in the early 1910s.

Design
The Hydravion was a large seaplane of biplane configuration, which relied on the design philosophy of Henri Farman by utilizing a pusher engine and the tail being supported on outrigger booms. Only one seaplane version was built, and it crashed at Dartford during early tests.

A later version of the Hydravion, the Vickers No. 14B, would have had two  Gnome 9 Delta engines in tandem configuration buried in the fuselage, driving tractor propellers as well as a nose-mounted  semi-automatic cannon.

Specifications

References

Hydravion
1910s British experimental aircraft
Flying boats
Amphibious aircraft
Single-engined pusher aircraft
Biplanes
Aircraft first flown in 1912